Sturgeon Bay is a city in the U.S. state of Wisconsin.

Sturgeon Bay may also refer to the following:

Communities

in the United States:
 Sturgeon Bay, Michigan, a community in Bliss Township 
 Sturgeon Bay (town), Wisconsin, a town in Door County

in Canada:
 Sturgeon Bay, Ontario, a village in Tay

Bodies of water

Sturgeon Bay, a bay in Door County, Wisconsin
Sturgeon Bay (Michigan), a bay in Emmet County, Michigan

Transportation 

 Sturgeon Bay Road, section of Wisconsin Highway 57 from Green Bay to Dyckesville, Wisconsin

See also 
 Sturgeon Bay Bridge, a historic bridge in Sturgeon Bay, Wisconsin
 Sturgeon Bay Canal Light, a lighthouse near Sturgeon Bay, Wisconsin
 Sturgeon Bay Canal North Pierhead Light, a lighthouse near Sturgeon Bay, Wisconsin
 Sturgeon Bay Post Office, the main post office in Sturgeon Bay, Wisconsin
 Sturgeon Bay Ship Canal, a shipping canal connecting Sturgeon Bay with Lake Michigan